Carthamus caeruleus is a species of plants in the family Asteraceae.

Sources

References 

caeruleus
Flora of Malta